Holovne is an urban-type settlement located in western Ukraine. It is in Kovel Raion in Volyn Oblast, but was formerly administered within Liuboml Raion. The population is

History 

During World War II, in summer 1942, local Jews were murdered in mass executions perpetrated by an einsatzgruppen of gendarmes and Ukrainian police; 70 to 80 people were massacred.

References 

Ruthenian Voivodeship
Vladimir-Volynsky Uyezd
Wołyń Voivodeship (1921–1939)
Holocaust locations in Ukraine
Massacres in Ukraine
World War II massacres
Villages in Kovel Raion